Imad Sarsam (also transliterated: Emad) was an orthopaedic surgeon. 

His qualifications included the FRCS (UK), D.Sc (Ortho.) and M.B.Ch.B.

External links
The Effect of Tensile Forces on Shoulder Capsule Integrity, poster presentation at the 2004 9th International Congress on Surgery of the Shoulder Meeting, organised by the American Shoulder and Elbow Surgeons, May 2-May 3, 2004

Year of birth missing
2004 deaths
Assassinated Iraqi people
Iraqi surgeons
Fellows of the Royal College of Surgeons
People murdered in Iraq
Academic staff of the University of Baghdad
2004 murders in Iraq